Agononida soelae is a species of squat lobster in the family Munididae. The species is named for the research vessel "Soela", which is the vessel on which the type specimen was collected.

References

Squat lobsters
Crustaceans described in 1986